The 1999 Colorado State Rams football team represented Colorado State University in the 1999 NCAA Division I-A football season. The team was led by seventh-year head coach Sonny Lubick and played its home games at Hughes Stadium. They finished the regular season with an 8–3 record overall and a 5–2 record in the newly formed Mountain West Conference, making them conference co-champions. The team was selected to play in the Liberty Bowl, in which they lost to Southern Miss.

Schedule

Rankings

Roster

References

Colorado State
Colorado State Rams football seasons
Mountain West Conference football champion seasons
Colorado State Rams football